Rechtabhra mac Dubbchomar (died 782) was Abbot of Aughrim, County Galway.

Rechtabhra mac Dubbchomar is one of only five known bishops, abbots or Erenaghs of Aughrim. He is the first to be explicitly noted as an abbot, while the previous three were stated as being bishops.

Events during his lifetime included:

 746 - Death of Coman, founder of Roscommon; the Blood court at Cannstatt
 755 - Offa deposes Bernred of Mercia; death of Gaimdibhla of Aran.
 769 - Death of Tomaltach mac Murghal, King of Mag Ai.
 781 - Battle of Ath Liacc Finn; Tallaght Monastery founded by Máel Ruain

References

 Annals of Ulster at CELT: Corpus of Electronic Texts at University College Cork
 Annals of Tigernach at CELT: Corpus of Electronic Texts at University College Cork
Revised edition of McCarthy's synchronisms at Trinity College Dublin.
 Byrne, Francis John (2001), Irish Kings and High-Kings, Dublin: Four Courts Press, 
 Lysaght, Eamonn (1978), The Surnames of Ireland. , pp. 233–34.

Christian clergy from County Galway
8th-century Irish abbots
782 deaths
Year of birth unknown